Sherwood was an electoral district of the Legislative Assembly in the Australian state of Queensland from 1950 to 1992.

First created for the 1950 state election, the district was based in the south-western suburbs of Brisbane, covering areas that previously belonged to the abolished district of Oxley. At first taking in a wide sweep of then-outer suburban areas such as Sunnybank, Runcorn and Kuraby, it came to be based in the Chelmer peninsula and the Centenary Suburbs from the 1960 election onwards, and was a very safe Liberal seat for its entire existence.

Sherwood was abolished by the 1991 redistribution, taking effect at the 1992 state election. Most of its territory was allocated to the new districts of Indooroopilly and Mount Ommaney.

Members for Sherwood

Election results

See also
 Electoral districts of Queensland
 Members of the Queensland Legislative Assembly by year
 :Category:Members of the Queensland Legislative Assembly by name

References

Former electoral districts of Queensland
1950 establishments in Australia
1992 disestablishments in Australia
Constituencies established in 1950
Constituencies established in 1992